Notoplax subviridis is a species of chiton in the family Acanthochitonidae.

Distribution
This species can be found in Western Australia.

References

subviridis
Molluscs described in 1911